The official flag of French Guiana, an overseas region and department of France located in South America, is the French flag. 

The local government also uses a white logo-flag depicting the silhouette of the French Guiana map and four arrows that reference the Maroon people.

Flag Ordeal
The green and yellow diagonal flag that is commonly used to represent French Guiana actually has no official status. The flag divides diagonally with green in the upper fly and yellow in the lower hoist and bears a red five pointed star in the center. Green represents the forests, Yellow represents gold and other minerals of the region, the red star represents socialism. This flag was unilaterally adopted by the general council (departmental council) of the overseas department of French Guiana on 29 January 2010, as a flag for the department of French Guiana. This was not recognized by the superior regional council. Both councils were disbanded in late 2015 and replaced by the French Guiana Assembly within the framework of the new Territorial Collectivity of French Guiana. Only the French flag is officially recognized by the French constitution as the national flag. The green and yellow flag is however still used by the French Guiana national football team and still commonly flown by civilians.

Gallery

See also
Coat of arms of French Guiana

References

External links

Guiana
Flag